Ras Acrata is a cape located in Algeria, about  from Algiers.

References

Landforms of Algeria
Headlands of Africa